József Mészáros (27 September 1884 – 19 August 1956) was a Hungarian rower. He competed in the men's single sculls event at the 1912 Summer Olympics.

References

External links
 

1884 births
1956 deaths
Hungarian male rowers
Olympic rowers of Hungary
Rowers at the 1912 Summer Olympics
Rowers from Budapest